Pseudochironomus is a genus of European and North American non-biting midges in the subfamily Chironominae of the bloodworm family Chironomidae.

Species
P. anas Townes, 1945
P. articaudus Sæther, 1977
P. badius Sæther, 1977
P. chen Townes, 1945
P. crassus Townes, 1945
P. fulviventris (Johannsen, 1905)
P. julia (Curran, 1930)
P. netta Townes, 1945
P. prasinatus (Staeger, 1839) 
P. pseudoviridis (Malloch, 1915)
P. rex Hauber, 1947
P. richardsoni Malloch, 1915

References

Chironomidae
Diptera of Europe